"Greetings to the New Brunette" is a song by Billy Bragg from the 1986 album Talking with the Taxman About Poetry. It was the second single from the album, following "Levi Stubbs' Tears", and reached No. 58 on the UK Singles Chart in October 1986.

The song features Johnny Marr on electric guitar, and vocals by Kirsty MacColl. The song was selected by actor David Tennant as one of his Desert Island Discs in 2010.

References

External links
 "Greetings to the New Brunette" at Allmusic.com
 "Greetings to the New Brunette" at Discogs.com

Billy Bragg songs
1986 songs
1986 singles
Songs written by Billy Bragg